The FFAR2–FFAR3 receptor heteromer is a receptor heteromer consisting of free fatty acid receptors, FFAR2 and FFAR3 protomers.

Signal transduction 
The signalling of the FFAR2-FFAR3 receptor heteromer is distinct from that of the parent receptor homomers. The FFAR2-FFAR3 heteromer displays enhanced intracellular calcium release and Arrestin beta 2 recruitment. The heteromer also lacks the ability to inhibit the cAMP-dependent pathway but gained the ability to induce P38 mitogen-activated protein kinases.

References